Hayat Toubal (born 1985) is an Algerian chess player who holds the title of Woman International Master.

Biography
Hayat Toubal twice in row won 2nd place in Women's Arab Chess Championship (2006, 2007).

In 2017, in Oran she won 2nd place after Shahenda Wafa in Women's African Chess Championship and qualified for the Women's World Chess Championship 2018. In 2018, she won 2nd place in Women's Algerian Chess Championship.

Hayat Toubal played for Algeria in the Women's Chess Olympiads:
 In 2006, at second board in the 37th Chess Olympiad (women) in Turin (+5, =5, -2),
 In 2014, at fourth board in the 41st Chess Olympiad (women) in Tromsø (+3, =5, -3),
 In 2016, at reserve board in the 42nd Chess Olympiad (women) in Baku (+2, =4, -3),
 In 2018, at third board in the 43rd Chess Olympiad (women) in Batumi (+5 =4 -1).

In 2005, she was awarded the FIDE Woman International Master (WIM) title.

References

External links

1985 births
Living people
Algerian female chess players
Chess Woman International Masters
Chess Olympiad competitors
21st-century Algerian women
20th-century Algerian women